The Mississippi Gambler is a 1929 American romantic drama film directed by Reginald Barker, and starring Joseph Schildkraut and Joan Bennett. While this early Universal Pictures talkie used a Western Electric Movietone sound-on-film system, it was also released in a silent version.

Cast
Joseph Schildkraut as Jack Morgan 
Joan Bennett as Lucy Blackburn 
Carmelita Geraghty as Suzette Richards 
Alec B. Francis as Junius Blackburn 
Otis Harlan as Tiny Beardsley 
William Welsh as Captain Weathers

References

External links

1929 films
Universal Pictures films
American black-and-white films
Films shot in New Orleans
1929 romantic drama films
Films about journalists
American romantic drama films
Films directed by Reginald Barker
1920s American films